The Office of Professional Responsibility (OPR), part of the United States Department of Justice (DOJ) and supervised by the FBI, is responsible for investigating lawyers employed by the Department of Justice who have been accused of misconduct or crime in the exercise of their professional functions.

History
The OPR was established in 1975 by order of then Attorney General Edward Levi, following revelations of ethical abuse and serious misconduct by senior DOJ officials during the Watergate scandal. The order directed OPR to "receive and review any information concerning conduct by a Department employee that may be in violation of law, regulations or orders, or applicable standards of conduct."

Since its inception in 1975, the OPR was headed by:
 1975 – 1997 Mike Shaheen
 1998 – 2009 H. Marshall Jarrett
 2009 – 2011 Mary Patrice Brown (acting head)
 2011 – 2018 Robin C. Ashton
 2018 – 2019 Corey R. Amundson
 2020 – present Jeffrey R. Ragsdale (acting head September 2019-May 2020)

Mission
OPR’s primary mission is to ensure that DOJ attorneys perform their duties in accordance with professional standards. 

The OPR promulgates independent standards of ethical and criminal conduct for DOJ attorneys, while the DOJ's Office of the Inspector General (OIG) has jurisdiction of non-attorney DOJ employees. 

The OPR receives reports of allegations of misconduct made against DOJ attorneys from many sources. Nearly half of all such allegations are reported to OPR by DOJ sources, such as the attorney involved. The remaining complaints come from a variety of sources, including private attorneys, defendants and civil litigants, other federal agencies, state or local government officials, judicial and congressional referrals, and media reports. OPR gives expedited attention to judicial findings of misconduct.

The OPR reviews each allegation and determines whether further investigation is warranted. The determination is a matter of investigative judgment that weighs many factors, including the nature of the allegation, its apparent credibility, its specificity, its susceptibility to verification, and the source of the allegation. A decision to open a matter does not give rise to a presumption of misconduct, nor shift the burden of proof to the accused person. The OPR's investigations involve a wide range of allegations, and the investigative methods used vary accordingly.

In many cases, the OPR notifies the accused attorney and requests a written response. Sometimes, the OPR also makes on-site investigations. The OPR reports the results of the investigation to the component head concerned and to the Office of the Deputy Attorney General. The OPR also advises the complainant and the accused attorney of its conclusion.

References

External links
 

United States Department of Justice agencies
Department of Justice
Professionalism